A duck decoy (or decoy duck) is a man-made object resembling a real duck. Duck decoys are sometimes used in waterfowl hunting to attract real ducks.

Duck decoys were historically carved from wood, often Atlantic white cedar wood on the east coast of the US from Maine to South Carolina, or cork.  Modern ones may also be made of canvas and plastic. They are usually painted, often elaborately and very accurately, to resemble various kinds of waterfowl.

History

Decoy ducks have been used in traditional hunting by Indigenous Australian peoples of the Murray River in South Australia.

The current world record price for an antique duck decoy at auction is a red-breasted merganser hen by Lothrop Holmes for $856,000. Guyette & Deeter and Christie's New York. January 2007.

The first million dollar price was achieved when two decoys (Canada goose and a preening pintail drake) by A. Elmer Crowell of East Harwich, MA were said to have sold for US$1.13 million each in a private sale, in September 2007. The record-setting decoys were sold in a larger collection of 31 decoys for $7.5 million in total so it remains for a single decoy to clearly break the $1 million mark.

Vintage factory decoys

Mason's Decoy Factory
The most famous of all factory-made decoys are Mason's which operated in Detroit, Michigan, from 1896 to 1924. Produced decoys in the same style as Peterson and Dodge. Produced five grades of decoys:
Premier Grade - two-piece, hollow body, flat bottoms, glass eyes, swirl paint on breast, notch carved bill, carved nostrils, carved nail.
Challenge - both one piece solid and two-piece hollow bodies, flat bottoms, glass eyes, less elaborate paint on breast, no notch carved bill, lesser carved nostrils, painted black nail.
Standard #1 or "Detroit"(glass eye) - smaller in stature, less carving, more paint detail, glass eyes.
Standard #2 (tack eye) - smaller in stature, less carving, somewhat less paint detail, tack eyes.
Standard #3 (painted eye) - smaller in stature, less carving, even less paint detail, painted eyes.

Other decoys
Peterson Decoy Factory – Began in 1873 by George Peterson in Detroit, Michigan. Sold factory to Jasper Dodge in 1883.
J.N. Dodge – Jasper N. Dodge (1829–1909) began his decoy production c. 1883 after purchasing the George Peterson Decoy Factory. Production ceased in 1905 and closed permanently in 1908.
William E. Pratt Manufacturing Co. – Established in 1893 in Joliet, Illinois, did not begin to produce decoys until 1921. Eventually bought out by the Animal Trap Company of America which became Victor.
J.W. Reynolds Decoy Company – Established in Chicago, Illinois
Swisher & Soule – Established in Decatur, Illinois.
Hays – Established in Jefferson City, MO.
H.A. Stevens – Harvey A. Stevens (d. 1894) began this factory in Weedsport, New York from 1880 to 1902. Harvey had several brothers that helped out at the shop, but George was the only one that would carve and paint decoys under his own label.  So, the two brothers made commercial decoys and they made them during two time periods.  First, the tackeye decoy made between 1870 and about 1890 and then the improved glasseye decoy made thereafter until George retired in the early 1900s.  The Stevens brothers made two models, the standard decoy and the sleeper "humpback" decoy.
Evans Factory – Walter Evans (1872–1948) was a large scale producer of fine hollow body duck decoys in Ladysmith, Wisconsin from the 1921 to 1932. Similar in appearance to the Mason Factory decoy.
G&H Decoys, Inc. – Began in 1934 one year after the federal government in the United States ended the practice of live birds being used as decoys in the practice of hunting. Their original 'Henryettan' design is still manufactured today in their facility and home office just north of Henryetta, Oklahoma. 
Wildfowler Decoys, Inc – Began in 1939, in Old Saybrook, Connecticut. In 1957 the company had a tragic fire that destroyed the building and most of its contents, the company was sold and moved to Quogue, New York. The company was bought by Charlie Birdsall in 1961, and moved to Point Pleasant, New Jersey. It was subsequently relocated into Babylon, New York in the mid-1970s. Occasionally, Wildfowler were contracted to produce decoys for the Abercrombie & Fitch catalog.
Herter's Inc – Popular sporting goods catalog company founded by George Leonard Herter in Waseca, Minnesota from the 1930s through 1970s.
L.L. Bean – Sporting goods mail order company based out of Freeport, Maine produced factory decoys for a few years. 
Peterborough Canoe Company – Famed canoe manufacturer out of Peterborough, Ontario known to make solid body decoys during 'lean' canoe production seasons."
 Mintz Decoys—Family owned business based out of Boise, Idaho and founded by master carver Don Mintz that pioneered the process of full body flocking on decoys, which creates a three-dimensional illusion and virtually eliminates all glare from the sun.  Said to be far superior to regular, factory-produced decoys.
General Fibre Company - Began mass production of the Ariduk brand of fibre duck decoys in 1946.  Based in St. Louis, Missouri, the manufacturer produced mallards, pin tails, blue bills, black ducks, canvas backs, oversized mallards, and oversized black ducks.  The company also produced goose decoys and crow shooter's kits.

Museums and collections
Det Grønne Museum (The Green Museum, national museum of hunting) - Denmark
American Folk Art Museum - New York, New York
Barnegat Bay Decoy and Bayman's Museum - Tuckerton, New Jersey
Birds of Vermont Museum - Huntington, Vermont
Bluebonnet Swamp Nature Center - Baton Rouge, Louisiana
Centerville Historical Society - Centerville, Massachusetts Elmer Crowell Collection
Charles Perdew Museum - Henry, Illinois
Core Sound Waterfowl Museum - Harkers Island, North Carolina
The Dorset House, Shelburne Museum - Shelburne, Vermont
Havre de Grace Decoy Museum - Havre de Grace, Maryland
Noyes Museum - Galloway Township, New Jersey (decoy collection currently held in Hammonton, New Jersey)
Milwaukee Public Museum - Milwaukee, Wisconsin
Peoria Riverfront Museum - Peoria, Illinois
Refuge Waterfowl Museum - Chincoteague, Virginia
Tuckerton Seaport - Tuckerton, New Jersey
Upper Bay Museum - North East, Maryland
Ward Museum of Wildfowl Art - Salisbury, Maryland
Wendell Gilley Museum - Southwest Harbor, Maine

Festivals
Core Sound Decoy Festival - Harkers Island, NC
Duck Duck Goose Day - Baton Rouge, LA
Easton Waterfowl Festival - Easton, MD
Havre de Grace's Annual Decoy & Wildlife Art Festival - Havre de Grace, MD
Ocean County Decoy & Gunning Show - Tuckerton, NJ
Thousand Islands Museum: Decoy & Wildlife Art Show - Clayton, NY
Upper Bay Museum Decoy Show - North East, MD
Ward World Championship- Ocean City, MD

Collectors associations
Canadian Decoy & Outdoor Collectables Association.
East Coast Decoy Collectors Association (Maryland and Virginia area)
Long Island Decoy Collectors Association
Midwest Decoy Collectors Association
Minnesota Decoy Collectors Association
New Jersey Decoy Collectors Association
Northwest Decoy Collectors Association
Ohio Decoy Collectors and Carvers Association
Potomac Decoy Collectors Association
Thousand Island Decoy Collectors Association

Notes

References

Earnest, Adele The Art of the Decoy: American Bird Carvings. Bramhall House, New York, NY
Waterfowl Decoys of Southwestern Ontario and the Men Who Made Them (Brisco, Paul 1986)
Decoying St. Clair to St. Lawrence (Crandell, Barney 1986)
Fleckenstein, Henry A. Jr (1979) Decoys of the Mid-Atlantic Region. Schiffer, Exton, PA 
Fleckenstein, Henry A. Jr (1983) New Jersey Decoys. Schiffer, Exton, PA 
Starr, George Ross, Jr. (1974) Decoys of The Atlantic Flyway. Winchester, New York, NY 
Goldberger, Russ J. and Haid, Alan G. (2003) Mason Decoys-A Complete Pictorial Guide: Expanded Edition. Decoy Magazine, Lewes, DE 

Country Home (June 1992 p. 86)

Folk art
Woodcarving
Ducks